The 24 Hours of Le Mans is an annual sports car race in France.

24 Hours of Le Mans may also refer to:

 24 Hours of Le Mans (motorcycle race), a motorcycle endurance race
 Le Mans 24 Hours video games including:
 WEC Le Mans, an arcade game
 Le Mans 24 (video game)
 Le Mans 24 Hours (video game), also known as Test Drive Le Mans

See also
 24 Hours of LeMons, an endurance race that is a parody of the one in France